Al-Ghazzawiyya, is a Palestinian village located 2 kilometers east of the city of Bet Shean (Bisan). In 1945, the population was 1,640, 1,020 Arab and 620 Jewish.

History
Several archeological sites in the area testify to a long history of human occupancy. The village was surrounded by the archeological sites  of Tall-al Barta to the north, Tall al-Husn to the west, and Tall al-Maliha to the southwest. Excavations of Tall al-Husn showed an occupational history extending from the third millennium BC to the eighth century CE, when the site was occupied by an Arab village.

British Mandate era
In modern times, the village spread over a wide area of the Baysan valley. The villagers were members of the al-Ghazzawiyya Beduin tribe, who constituted the bulk of the valley's population together with members of the al-Bashatiwa and the al-Suqur.
In the 1931 census, conducted by the British Mandate authorities,  'Arab Abu Hashiya had 156 Muslim inhabitants, and a total of 29 houses.

In the 1945 statistics, Al-Ghazzawiyya had 1,020, all Muslim inhabitants with a total of 18,408 dunams of land. Of this, a total of 13 dunams  were used for citrus and bananas, 5,185 dunums for cereals,  34 dunums were irrigated or used for orchards, while 91 dunams were classified as non-cultivable land.

1948 and aftermath
It was occupied by Israel's Golani Brigade on May 20, 1948, during Operation Gideon, an Israeli offensive during the 1948 Arab-Israeli War. The Arab population was forced to flee to nearby Syria or the present-day West Bank.

The Jewish localities of Maoz Haim and Neve Eitan are built on the lands of the former village, though a large percentage of it is used as agricultural land, in particular the wheat crop. According to Walid Khalidi, the village contained an archaeological site, Tell al-Ru'yan which was transformed into waste dump.

See also
Depopulated Palestinian locations in Israel

References

Bibliography

External links
Al-Ghazzawiyya
al-Ghazzawiyya,  Zochrot
Survey of Western Palestine, map 9:   IAA, Wikimedia commons
Al-Ghazzawiyya, from the Khalil Sakakini Cultural Center

Arab villages depopulated during the 1948 Arab–Israeli War
District of Baysan